Obsesiones is the twelfth album by Mexican pop singer Yuri, released in 1992. It sold more than 260,000 copies, earning platinum status. ERES Magazine in Mexico chose this album among the top ten of 1992. Singer Mijares covered the song "Como te amé" for his 2009 Spanish album Vivir Así.

Track listing

Production
 Producer: Mariano Pérez Bautista
 Producer "Química perfecta": Luis Enrique
 Production coordination: M.B.P.
 Recorded in: Sonoland, Kirios (Madrid); Lansdown House, Air Eden and CTS (London); Sony Music Mexico; Mosh (São Paulo) and Polygram (Rio de Janeiro)
 Recording engineer: Adrian Kerridge, Crispin Dibble, Pedro García, Josafat Neri, Bob Painter, Isaias García, Marcus Adrian and Scott Dillit
 Mix engineer: Bob Painter, Adrian Kerridge and Carlos Martos
 Recorded in London by string: Gavin Wright (Leader)
 Musicians on "Decir adiós (A través de los años)": London Big Band
 London Big Band musicians: Ralf Salmin (Drums); Paul Westwood (Double bass); Julian Carter, Clifford Ansell, Andy Rader and Keith Powell (Trumpets); Hal Gottlieb, Paul Lawrence and Tomas Gorrel (Saxophones); George Warren, John Wake and Charles Mann (Trombones); Graham Presket (Piano) and Tonia Duwall (Avisadora)
 Musical arrangements: Graham Presket, Javier Losada, Carlos Gómez, Julio Teixera and Ary Sperling
 Musicians: Charly Morgan and Caesar Cesina (Drums); Andy Paskt and Fernandiñho Souza (Bass); Nigel Jekins Micht Dalton, Victor Biglioni, and Rogerio Meanda (Guitars), Manolo Morales (Saxophone) and Mariano Pérez (Percussion)
 Backing vocals: Zarabanda, Ana Cirre, Angeles Soto, Pedro Núñez y Mariano Pérez
 Backing vocals in "Por vivir": Coral of the Conservatory of Mexico
 Schedules in Madrid (Spain) by: Javier Losada
 Programming made in Rio de Janeiro (Brazil) by: Ary Sperling
 Mixed digitally in Madrid (Spain) by: Mariano Pérez
 "Decir adiós (A través de los años)" Mixed at: CTS London by Adrian Kerridge and Mariano Pérez
 Art director: Arturo Medellín
 Graphic design: Rocio Larrazolo
 Photos: Carlos Somonte
 Stylist: Gabriela D'Aque
 Make-up: Alan Simancas

Singles
 "Decir adiós (A Traves de los años)"
 "Química Perfecta" (feat. Luis Enrique)
 "Así es la vida"
 "Poligamia"
 "Este es mi chico"
 "Nadie va a extrañarte más" (Chile only)
 "Como te amé"

Chart positions

References

1992 albums
Yuri (Mexican singer) albums